Ludwig Samuel "Lou" Meibusch (26 March 1893 – 1 December 1965) was a rugby union player who represented Australia.

Meibusch, a wing, was born in Toowoomba, Queensland and claimed 1 international rugby cap for Australia. His older brother Jack Meibusch also made a Wallaby appearance in 1904.

References

Australian rugby union players
Australia international rugby union players
1893 births
1960s deaths
Rugby union players from Queensland
Rugby union wings